Aleksi Anttalainen (born March 28, 1999) is a Finnish professional ice hockey defenceman currently playing for TPS of the Liiga.

Anttalainen initially played in TPS's junior teams from 2013 to 2017. He then spent two seasons playing in the Quebec Major Junior Hockey League for the Blainville-Boisbriand Armada and the Moncton Wildcats before returning to TPS in 2019. He made his Liiga debut for TPS on September 14, 2019 against Ässät.

References

External links

1999 births
Living people
Blainville-Boisbriand Armada players
Finnish ice hockey defencemen
Moncton Wildcats players
Sportspeople from Turku
HC TPS players
21st-century Finnish people